Barkley is an unincorporated community in Marion County, in the U.S. state of Missouri.

The community has the name of Levi Barkley, a pioneer citizen.

References

Unincorporated communities in Marion County, Missouri
Unincorporated communities in Missouri